St Clare's School is the name of many schools. Most St Clare's Schools have a religious heritage and are named after Saint Clare of Assisi:

Schools
St Clare's Catholic Primary School – from List of schools in Cheshire West and Chester, England
St Clare's Catholic Primary School – in Narellan Vale, New South Wales, Australia
St. Clare's Girls' School – a Catholic school in Hong Kong
St Clare's, Oxford – an independent international school in England
St Clare's School, Newton – a coeducational independent school in South Wales
Saint Clare School – a Catholic elementary school in Santa Clara, California
St. Clare School – a Catholic school affiliated with St. Clare's Church (Staten Island, New York)
St. Clare Science High School – a coeducational school in Antipolo City, Philippines
St. Clare of Assisi School - a grammar school in The Bronx, NY

Schools with similar titles
St Clare's College, Canberra – a private girls' school in Australia
St Clare's College, Waverley – a private girls' school in Australia

See also
 St. Clare's (series) – books about a fictitious boarding school